Boobir Creek Dam is a relatively small dam that supplies the town water supply for Blackbutt, Queensland.

Management
The dam is owned and managed by the South Burnett Regional Council (until 2008, by Nanango Shire Council) to provide a safe, reliable water supply for Blackbutt. At present, tourist facilities are not provided and the road into the dam is locked.

Drought
During the early 2000s drought, Boobir Creek Dam ran nearly dry, and Nanango Shire Council called for urgent tenders to complete a pipeline from Wivenhoe Dam. The project was altered after years of good, flooding rain in 2008, 2010/11 and 2013.

References

See also

List of dams and reservoirs in Australia

Reservoirs in Queensland
Wide Bay–Burnett
Dams in Queensland